

Direct mandates 
Graphic of possible distribution of direct mandates

By probability

Second place

See also 
Opinion polling for the 2017 German federal election
Opinion polling for the 2013 German federal election

External links 
Wahlrecht.de 
pollytix-Wahltrend 
DAWUM Wahltrend 
Twitter: @Wahlen_DE 

Next
Forecasting